Shaa Lysa Wasmund MBE is a British businesswoman.

Early life
Wasmund was educated at the London School of Economics, during which period she won a competition with Cosmopolitan magazine to interview the boxer Chris Eubank. During the interview Eubank invited Wasmund to become his assistant and manage his PR. While still at university, she promoted Eubank in the 1990 Nigel Benn vs. Chris Eubank match.

Career
In 1994, Wasmund started her own PR firm which managed the launch of Dyson vacuum cleaners.

Later, she became a founding director of the travel website Deckchair. She then went on to launch lifestyle website "My kinda place" in 2000. Seven years later, the site was sold to BSkyB. In 2007, Wasmund established Bright Station Ventures, an investment vehicle with $100 million of capital. In January 2009, Wasmund launched Smarta, a site providing information for entrepreneurs and small business owners.

Wasmund was appointed Member of the Order of the British Empire (MBE) in the 2015 New Year Honours for services to business and entrepreneurship.

Author 
Wasmund has published multiple books including How to Fix Your Shit: A Straightforward Guide to A Better Life, Do Less > Get More - How to Work Smart and Live Life Your Way and Stop Talking, Start Doing - A Kick in the pants in six parts.

References

External links

Date of birth missing (living people)
Living people
Members of the Order of the British Empire
Alumni of the London School of Economics
Year of birth missing (living people)